Anthonij Ewoud Jan Bertling (13 December 1860, Assen – 2 February 1945, Hilversum) was a Dutch politician.

See also
 List of Dutch politicians

References

Links
 Profile

1860 births
1945 deaths
Dutch civil servants
Ministers of Finance of the Netherlands
People from Assen
Independent politicians in the Netherlands